Gargling is the act of bubbling liquid in the mouth. It is also the washing of one's mouth and throat with a liquid, such as mouthwash, that is kept in motion by breathing through it with a gurgling sound.

A traditional home remedy of gargling warm saltwater is sometimes recommended to soothe a sore throat.

One study in Japan has shown that gargling water a few times a day will lower the chance of upper respiratory infections such as common colds, though some medical authorities are skeptical.

See also
 Stomach rumble

References

Oral hygiene